The Most Revered Order of Sultan Mahmud I of Terengganu (Bahasa Melayu: Darjah Kebesaran Sultan Mahmud I Terengganu Yang Amat Terpuji) is a dormant honorific order of the Sultanate of Terengganu

History 
It was founded by Sultan Mahmud al-Muktafi Billah Shah on 28 February 1982 and is no more awarded since his death in 1998.
It has been superseded by the Order of Sultan Mizan Zainal Abidin of Terengganu.

Classes 
It is awarded in three classes:
Member Grand Companion or Ahli Sri Setia (Max. 16 recipients) - S.S.M.T.
Member Knight Companion or Ahli Dato' Setia (Max. 32 recipients) - D.S.M.T.
Member Companion or Ahli Setia (Max. 60 recipients) - A.S.M.

Recipients
 Mahmud of Terengganu
 Mizan Zainal Abidin of Terengganu
 Sirajuddin of Perlis
 Tengku Intan Zaharah
 Sultanah Nur Zahirah
 Mahathir Mohamad
 Wan Mokhtar Wan Ahmad
 Ahmad Sarji Abdul Hamid
 Vincent Tan
 Abdul Hadi Awang
 Abdul Hamid Omar

References 

Terengganu, Order of Sultan Mahmud I
Orders, decorations, and medals of Terengganu